Trond-Viggo Torgersen (born 14 June 1952 in Oslo, Norway) is a Norwegian physician, broadcaster, television host, actor, comedian, singer, songwriter, artist and former children's ombudsman.

Artistic career
Torgersen started in NRK making programs for children and youth, like Flode and Kroppen, and he was the first program host for Halvsju. He has published several children's albums and was awarded Spellemannprisen 1981 in the class Children's music, together with George Keller, for the album Det by'ner nå. Familiar songs like "Tenke sjæl", "Hjalmar", "Slapp reggae", "Stilig" and "Puss, puss, så får du en suss" is signed by Torgersen. He has also written several plays for children and adults. Hjalmar og Flode has been set up on Oslo Nye Teater, Hordaland Teater and Rogaland Teater.

His books Kroppen (The Body), Flode alene (Flode Alone) and Tenke sjæl (approx. To Think for Yourself) have been translated into several languages.

In recent years, he is perhaps best known as a comedian and artist on radio and television, and from concert stages across the country. In Norway he is especially known for the characters «Vaktmester'n», and «Fem på gaten», and had several programs from Samfundet in Trondheim entitled Trond-Viggo og Samfundet.

Torgersen studied medicine, was Norway's second Ombudsman for children, and is now appointed as Head of NOU Ungdommens maktutredning (Youth power survey) for the Barne- og likestillings- og inkluderingsdepartementet (Ministry of Children, Equality and Inclusion). He is married to Kristin Helle-Valle. He currently resides in Bergen.

The Backing Band
Atle Halstensen - keyboards, accordion and backing vocals
Mats Grønner – guitars, banjo and backing vocals
Jens Fossum – bass and backing vocals
Eirik Andre Rydningen – percussion and backing vocals

Former member
Bernt Rune Stray – guitars and backing vocals

Discography

Albums
Kua med fletter og juret på tvers (1976)
Harunosågirebort (1977)
Bare barn er barn (Men alle er vi barnebarn) (1979)
Eyvind & Trond-Viggo (1979) with Eyvind Solås
Petter og ulven (1980)
Det by'ner nå! (1981)
Trond-Viggo Vol. I (1976-1978) (1992)
Trond-Viggo Vol. II (1981-1985) (1992)
Eyvind & Trond-Viggo|Samleplate (1994)
Trond-Viggos beste (1997)
Barnetimen for de store (2002)
De du kan + Noe nytt & Noe rart (2007)

Singles
Rappe pølse/pølse (1991) with Trond Kirkvaag
Body roll (1991) as Vaktmester'n

Audiobooks
Hjalmar og flode (2003)
Tenke sjæl (2007)

Career Overview
Artist, freelance in NRK 1974–1989
Doctor and Researcher 1980–1989
Barneombud 1989–1995
Advisor for the television director in NRK 1995–1997
Channel Manager NRK2 1997–1998
Manager of cultureNRK 1998–2000
Journalist Entertainment Division NRK 2000–Current

References

External links
Trond-Viggo Torgersen Biography - Store Norske Leksikon

1952 births
Living people
Children's Ombudsmen in Norway
Physicians from Oslo
Norwegian broadcasters
Norwegian entertainers